The French submarine Néréide was the second and last  built for the French Navy during the 1910s.

See also 
List of submarines of France

Citations

Bibliography

 

Ships built in France
1914 ships
World War I submarines of France